Egor Sokolov (born June 7, 2000) is a Russian professional ice hockey left winger currently playing for the Belleville Senators of the American Hockey League (AHL) as a prospect to the Ottawa Senators of the National Hockey League (NHL). He was selected by the Senators in the second round, 61st overall, of the 2020 NHL Entry Draft.

Career
Sokolov was selected in the  Quebec Major Junior Hockey League (QMJHL) import draft by the Cape Breton Screaming Eagles with the 35th overall pick. After coming over to Canada from Russia for the 2017–18 season his teammate, Drake Batherson, helped get him accustomed to North American life. He played three seasons in the QMJHL with the Screaming Eagles, scoring 97 goals and 191 points in 184 games.

He was passed over in two National Hockey League (NHL) entry drafts before being selected by the Ottawa Senators in the second round, 61st overall in the 2020 NHL Entry Draft. Prior to his selection by the Senators, Sokolov had attended the development camps of the Columbus Blue Jackets and Toronto Maple Leafs. On November 20, 2020, the Senators signed Sokolov to a three-year entry level contract. After attending his first training camp, Sokolov was assigned to Ottawa's American Hockey League (AHL) affiliate, the Belleville Senators. He was recalled by the Senators on November 8, 2021 and played in his first NHL game on November 9, 2021, against the Boston Bruins.

Career statistics

Regular season and playoffs

International

Awards and honours

References

External links

2000 births
Living people
Belleville Senators players
Belye Medvedi Chelyabinsk players
Cape Breton Screaming Eagles players
Ottawa Senators draft picks
Ottawa Senators players
Ice hockey players at the 2016 Winter Youth Olympics